is a 1953 Japanese black-and-white film, directed by Seiji Hisamatsu.

Cast 
 Ayako Wakao
 Fujiko Yamamoto
 Yōko Minamida
 Kazuko Fushimi
 Mitsuko Kimura
 Kyōko Aoyama
 Kenji Sugawara
 Jun Negami
 Eiji Funakoshi
 Ken Hasebe
 Tatsuyoshi Ehara

References 

Japanese black-and-white films
1953 films
Films directed by Seiji Hisamatsu
Daiei Film films
1950s Japanese films